Nikola Aleksić (Stari Bečej, Austrian Empire, 1808 – Arad, Austria-Hungary, now Romania, 1 January 1873) was a Serbian artist. He was under the influence of the painting styles of the Nazarene movement and Biedermeier.

Biography 
He came from a family of artists in Stari Bečej. He was taught painting at the studio of Arsenije Teodorović of Novi Sad until 1826. Then, he went to Vienna and enrolled at the Academy of Fine Arts (1828–1830).

Later, he traveled to Italy to broaden his art education. There he honed his craft for three years, getting to know the art of the Nazarene movement, and making a living from portrait painting. He also copied old masters in the city's galleries and painted portraits of Austrian officers of Serbian descent. In 1834 he left Italy for Novi Sad, then he went to Sremski Karlovci, where he made a portrait of Metropolitan Stefan Stratimirović.

After three years of working in the Principality of Serbia, he was drawn back to his childhood haunts. In 1837, he settled in Kikinda, where he opened his own atelier. From there he moved to Timișoara in 1840 and later settled in Arad, where his relatives lived and where spent the rest of his life. Artists Novak Radonić and Aksentije Marodić were his apprentices. In Timișoara, he married Marija Stankić, a beautiful Serbian woman from Verona. Nikola's successors, son Dušan and his two grandsons Stevan and Ivan were also prominent painters.

Works 
He is considered the most productive Serbian painter in the first half of the nineteenth century. He did approximately a thousand icons and many neo-classicistic portraits. Among his first religious works are the icons in the iconostasis and the vault of the Serbian church in Mol and the iconostasis in the Romanian church in Fibiş, near Temisvar (1837–1838).

 1837. Iconostasis in the Serbian church in Mol)
 1838. Iconostasis in the Romanian church in Fibiş
 1839. Iconostasis and frescoes in the Serbian church in Banatsko Aranđelovo
 1841. Iconostasis in the Romanian church in Kovin
 1845. Iconostasis in the Serbian church in Sânmartinu Sârbesc
 1845–1846. Frescoes in the Serbian church in Arad
 1846. Iconostasis in Serbian church in Srpski Sveti Petar (Sânpetru Mare, Romania)
 1847. Iconostasis in the Serbian church in Elemir
 1848. Frescoes in the Serbian church in Novi Kneževac
 1854. Iconostasis and frescoes in Kumane
 1855. Iconostasis in Novo Miloševo
 1857. Frescoes in the Serbian church in Mokrin
 1858. Iconostasis in Radojevo
 1859. Frescoes in the church in Melenci
 1861. Iconostasis in the Serbian church in Mali Bečkerek, now Zrenjanin
 1862. Iconostasis in the Serbian church in Variaş
 1863. Iconostasis in the Romanian church in Arad
 1865–1866. Iconostasis in the Serbian church in Arad
 1867. Iconostasis in the church in Micălaca, near Arad
 1868–1869. Iconostasis in the Serbian church in Gospođinci
 1870–1871. Iconostasis and frescoes in the Serbian church in Ostojićevo

Gallery

See also
 List of painters from Serbia
 Serbian art

References 

1808 births
1873 deaths
19th-century Serbian people
People from Bečej